A total of 40 teams will contest the league divided into four groups, Eteläinen (Southern), Pohjoinen (Northern), Läntinen (Western) and Itäinen (Eastern). 29 returning from the 2014 season, two relegated from Ykkönen and nine promoted from Kolmonen. The champion of each group will qualify to promotion matches to decide which two teams get promoted to the Ykkönen. The bottom three teams in each group and the worst seventh-placed will qualify directly for relegation to Kolmonen. Each team will play a total of 27 matches, playing three times against each team of its group.

FC Viikingit and JIPPO were relegated from the 2014 Ykkönen, while EIF, MP, PS Kemi and VIFK were promoted to the 2015 Ykkönen.

FC Espoo, FC Hämeenlinna, FC Viikkarit, JBK, OLS, PK-37, SC KuFu-98, SOVO and Sporting were relegated from 2014 Kakkonen.

ESC, FC Kiffen, FC Kiisto, FC Santa Claus AC, FCV, KaaPo, MuSa, NJS and Sudet were promoted from the 2014 Kolmonen.

Stadia and locations

League tables

Eteläinen (Southern)

Pohjoinen (Northern)

Läntinen (Western)

Itäinen (Eastern)

Promotion play-offs
Group winners will play two-legged ties. Team pairs will be drawn and the two winning teams will be promoted to the Ykkönen for season 2016.

Group winners
Eteläinen (Southern): FC Honka
Pohjoinen (Northern): KPV
Läntinen (Western): GrIFK
Itäinen (Eastern): Klubi-04

First leg

Second leg

KPV won 2–1 on aggregate.

GrIFK won 8–1 on aggregate.

Eight-placed teams
At the end of the season, a comparison is made between the seventh-placed teams. The worst seventh-placed team will be directly relegated to the Kolmonen.
The worst seventh-placed team will be determined by point average, because of an uneven number of teams in groups.

References

Kakkonen seasons
3
Fin
Fin